Whaleboat Island Marine Provincial Park is a provincial park in British Columbia, Canada, located just southeast of Ruxton Island, to the southeast of the city of Nanaimo.

References

Provincial parks of British Columbia
Provincial Parks of the Gulf Islands
Marine parks of Canada